Harry Nyirenda (born 25 August 1990 in Blantyre, Malawi) is a Malawian footballer, who currently plays for South African side Mighty Wanderers FC.

International career
Nyirenda made his debut for the Malawi national football team in 2009 and is part of the team competing at the 2010 African Cup of Nations.

References

1990 births
Living people
People from Blantyre
Malawian footballers
Malawi international footballers
2010 Africa Cup of Nations players
Malawian expatriate footballers
Black Leopards F.C. players
Expatriate soccer players in South Africa
Malawian expatriate sportspeople in South Africa
Association football defenders